White Noise is a song by American rock musicians Chester Bennington, Dave Farrell, Joe Hahn and Mike Shinoda from Linkin Park, and Alec Puro from Deadsy, which was released on October 17, 2014 through Warner Bros. Records and Machine Shop Records.

The song was released in the promotion of a 2014 American drama film based on a novel written by Eric Bogosian named as Mall. The song is one of the four unreleased demos by Linkin Park included in the original motion picture soundtrack to the same name of the film.

Background
The song actually was an unreleased demo written while the recording sessions of the Linkin Park sixth studio album, The Hunting Party. On October 15, 2014, the band confirmed the song to be featured during the opening credits of Mall. On October 17, the song was available for free download in its entire length through the official Mall website as the first promotional single for the first time. The song was finished after the release of the studio album, whereas in an interview Joe Hahn said that the score was already finished before the recording of the album started.

Due to the early release of the movie in DVD in France, only half part of the song was available as an illegal download from various websites, along with the four unreleased demos, entitled "It Goes Through", "Devil's Drop", and "The Last Line" under their working titles "Luna", "Warm Spell", and "Ammosick" respectively. The song was released under the same title that it had during recording sessions. Though the song was released as a promotional single in promotion of the film, the background score of the film revolved more around other three songs comparatively. "The Last Line" was available on YouTube and in digital download format, under the name of "Mall: Theme Song".

Composition
In an article by Loudwire the song is described as featuring a very distinctive toy piano sound in certain parts, and acquainted by Linkin Park lead singer Chester Bennington's heavy vocals and a fast-paced beat. Shinoda at the premiere screening of the film described the music as, Hahn had recently handpicked ten demos throughout Linkin Park's career as their starting for the music in the film. From there the band members started to work on the music. He recalls Hahn's selections of unreleased demos that they're more like 'raw' and 'stream of consciousness' pieces of music, which will fit well in construction for Mall.

In an article by 101 WRIF, Gary Graff comments on the song as "Linkin Park has released a new song that wasn't featured on The Hunting Party, their sixth studio that was released in June 2014, as they offer a free digital download of 'White Noise' that is featured on the soundtrack to Mall, Hahn's newest film that is confined as his first directing debut, after his first short film The Seed. Hahn was able to go through some of the unreleased demos from Linkin Park's previous studio albums from their throughout career for the soundtrack to Mall, and using Linkin Park's music became a natural fit for the project." Joe Hahn commented on the fitting of the song in film as:

Track listing

Release history

References

External links
 Official website of movie
 Mall on Facebook
 Mall on Twitter

Linkin Park songs
2014 songs